Who's Who in CIA is a book written by the East German journalist Julius Mader (also known by the alias Thomas Bergner) and published in East Berlin in 1968, under Stasi auspices and probably with KGB assistance. Mader was employed by the East German military publishing house and apparently had access to some information on CIA officers that was not publicly available. The book purported to identify about 3,000 active agents of the U.S. Central Intelligence Agency. It was modeled after other Who's Who guides.

Background 

Biographical information was compiled with the cooperation of Mohamed Abdelnabi, Ambalal Bhatt, Fernando Gamarra and Shozo Ohashi. The book also includes fold-out organizational charts (late 1960s) of the following: American Intelligence Services, Office of Intelligence Research (OIR), Military Intelligence Headquarters of the US, National Security Agency (NSA), Federal Bureau of Investigation (FBI), System of several cover organizations used by the CIA.

Mader had neither a publisher's statement nor a license number. He listed himself as an editor with the address of Dr. Julius Mader, 1066 Berlin W 66, Mauerstr. 66 at. In the book, two detachable cards were involved. The reader could send him corrections and additions as well as more names of CIA agents and other intelligence officials.

Many famous people are listed in this book, including Bill Moyers, Lyndon Johnson, Robert McNamara, and others. More than once a 'new' CIA name has surfaced in Western media that had been sitting in Mader's book all along. Six agents from the CIA backed Chile coup of 1973 are also named in the book. A copy of this book without the dust cover has been on display at the International Spy Museum in Washington, DC.

From Who's Who in CIA:

The rulers of the USA are, of course, extremely interested in keeping the mantle of secrecy over their intelligence network. The invisible government shall have neither names nor faces. For this reason the time appeared to have come to demask a first representative selection of leading officials and officers, collaborators and agents of the US intelligence services who are operating on five continents. The result is this book whereby CIA is used as an appropriate synonym for the whole of the US intelligence system.

Critical reception 

The book was later reviewed by Art Kunkin of the Los Angeles Free Press in March 1969.  The review included excerpts and one of the five organizational fold out charts and can be found here: Hood College, JFK Files

According to Ladislav Bittman of the Czechoslovakian StB, Who's Who was only partly reliable, and was intended as disinformation:

About half of the names listed in that book are real CIA operatives. The other half are people who were just American diplomats or various officials; and it was prepared with the expectation that naturally many, many Americans operating abroad, diplomats and so on, would be hurt because their names were exposed as CIA officials.

Who's Who in CIA was publicized through the early 1990s in the publications Top Secret and Geheim.

CIA response 

In retaliation, the CIA assisted journalist John Barron in writing his book KGB: The Secret Work of Soviet Secret Agents, the appendix of which named 1,600 alleged KGB and GRU officers posted abroad under diplomatic cover. Barron told  the New York Times, that he received help from the CIA in writing the appendix.

CIA Station Chief Richard Welch was assassinated in Greece in 1975 by the Marxist Revolutionary Organization 17 November (17N). Welch had previously been outed as a CIA operative in Who's Who In CIA. His assassination eventually led to the Intelligence Identities Protection Act.

See also
Intelligence Identities Protection Act
Plame affair
Inside the Company

References

Espionage
East German books
1968 non-fiction books
Soviet Union intelligence operations
Soviet Union–United States relations
East Germany–Soviet Union relations
Non-fiction books about the Central Intelligence Agency
Disinformation operations